Gymnobothrus is the type genus of grasshoppers in the tribe Gymnobothrini Uvarov, 1953; species can be found in Africa.  Besides the synonyms listed here, several species were considered similar-to and previously placed in, the genus Chortoicetes.

Species
The Orthoptera Species File lists:
 Gymnobothrus anchietae Bolívar, 1890
 Gymnobothrus carinatus Uvarov, 1942
 Gymnobothrus cruciatus Bolívar, 1890
 Gymnobothrus flexuosus (Schulthess, 1898)
 Gymnobothrus gracilis (Ramme, 1931)
 Gymnobothrus levipes (Karsch, 1896)
 Gymnobothrus lineaalba Bolívar, 1890 - type species (as G. linea alba Bolívar)
 Gymnobothrus longicornis (Ramme, 1931)
 Gymnobothrus madacassus Bruner, 1911
 Gymnobothrus oberthuri Bolívar, 1891
 Gymnobothrus pullus (Karny, 1917)
 Gymnobothrus rimulatus (Karsch, 1896)
 Gymnobothrus roemeri (Karny, 1909)
 Gymnobothrus scapularis Bolívar, 1890
 Gymnobothrus temporalis (Stål, 1876)
 Gymnobothrus variabilis'' Bruner, 1911

References

External Links 
 

Acrididae genera
Orthoptera of Africa